This is a list of castles in Italy by location.

Abruzzo

Province of L'Aquila
Castello normanno, Anversa degli Abruzzi
Castello Orsini-Colonna, Avezzano
Castello Piccolomini, Balsorano
Castle of Barisciano, Barisciano
Castello di Barrea, Barrea
Castle of Bominaco, Bominaco
Castello di Bugnara, Bugnara
Rocca Calascio, Calascio
Castello Piccolomini, Capestrano
Castello di Carsoli, Carsoli
Castello di Castel di Sangro, Castel di Sangro
Palazzo dei Conti di Celano, Castelvecchio Subequo
Castello Piccolomini, Celano
Castle of Fossa, Fossa
Castello di Gagliano Aterno, Gagliano Aterno
Forte Spagnolo, L'Aquila
Castello Orsini, Massa d'Albe
Palazzo Santucci, Navelli
Castle of Ocre, Ocre
Castello di Oricola, Oricola
Castello di Ortona dei Marsi, Ortona dei Marsi
Castello Piccolomini, Ortucchio
Castello Caldora, Pacentro
Castello di Pereto, Pereto
Castello Cantelmo, Pettorano sul Gizio
Castel Camponeschi, Prata d'Ansidonia
Castello De Sanctis, Roccacasale
Castle of San Pio delle Camere, San Pio delle Camere
Castle of Sant'Eusanio Forconese, Sant'Eusanio Forconese
Rocca Orsini, Scurcola Marsicana
Rocca di Villalago, Villalago

Province of Chieti
Palazzo baronale, Archi
Castle of Carpineto Sinello, Carpineto Sinello
Castello Masciantonio, Casoli
Castelfraiano, Castiglione Messer Marino
Castello Caldora, Civitaluparella
Castello Baglioni, Civitella Messer Raimondo
Castello ducale di Crecchio, Crecchio
Castello di Gamberale, Gamberale
Castello di Septe, Mozzagrogna
Castello Franceschelli, Montazzoli
Castello di Monteodorisio, Monteodorisio
Castello Aragonese, Ortona
Castello marchesale, Palmoli
Castello di Roccascalegna, Roccascalegna
Castello Caldoresco, Vasto

Province of Pescara
Castello di Musellaro, Bolognano
Castello Mediceo, Bussi sul Tirino
Castello Chiola-Caracciolo, Loreto Aprutino
Castello De Sterlich-Aliprandi, Nocciano
Castello ducale, Pescosansonesco
Castello ducale Cantelmo, Popoli
Palazzo De Felice, Rosciano
Castello di Salle, Salle
Castello Farnese, San Valentino in Abruzzo Citeriore
Castel Menardo, Serramonacesca
Castello Caracciolo, Tocco da Casauria
Castello Gizzi, Torre de' Passeri

Province of Teramo
, Cermignano
Fortezza di Civitella del Tronto, Civitella del Tronto
Castel Manfrino, Valle Castellana

Aosta Valley

, Pont-Saint-Martin
Savoy Castle (Gressoney-Saint-Jean), Gressoney-Saint-Jean
Fort Bard (or Bard Fort), Bard
 Verrès Castle, Verrès
 Issogne Castle, Issogne
 Graines Castle, Brusson
, Montjovet
, Montjovet
, Châtillon
Cly Castle, Saint Denis
 Fénis Castle, Fénis
, Nus
, Quart
, Aosta
, Sarre
, Aymavilles
Saint-Pierre Castle, Saint-Pierre
Sarriod de la Tour Castle, Saint-Pierre
Châtel-Argent, Villeneuve
, Introd
, Arvier
, Avise
 Châtelard Castle, La Salle

Apulia

Province of Bari
Castello Svevo, Bari
Conversano Castle, Conversano
Castle of Charles V, Monopoli
Santo Stefano Castle, Monopoli
Castello Normanno-Svevo, Sannicandro di Bari
Castello Normanno, Terlizzi
Altamura Castle, Altamura

Province of Barletta-Andria-Trani
Castel del Monte, Andria
Barletta Castle, Barletta
Castello Normanno, Spinazzola
, Trani

Province of Brindisi
Castello Grande, Brindisi
Forte a Mare, Brindisi
Francavilla Fontana Castle, Francavilla Fontana
Oria Castle, Oria, Apulia
Castello Dentice di Frasso, San Vito dei Normanni

Province of Foggia
Lucera Castle, Lucera
Manfredonia Castle, Manfredonia
Monte Sant ' Angelo Castle, Monte Sant'Angelo
, San Nicandro Garganico

Province of Lecce
Copertino Castle, Copertino
Gallipoli Castle, Gallipoli
Castle of Charles V, Lecce
, Melendugno
Castello Aragonese, Otranto
, Vernole

Province of Taranto
Episcopio Castle, Grottaglie
Aragonese Castle, Taranto

Basilicata

Province of Matera
Bernalda Castle, Bernalda
Castello Tramontano, Matera
Castello del Malconsiglio, Miglionico
, Pisticci
, Valsinni

Province of Potenza
, Avigliano, Basilicata
Laurenzana Castle, Laurenzana
, Maratea
Castle of Melfi, Melfi
, Venosa

Calabria

Province of Catanzaro 

Castello normanno-svevo di Nicastro 
Province of Cosenza
Ducal Castle, Corigliano Calabro
San Mauro's Castle, Corigliano Calabro
, Acri
, Cosenza
, Roseto Capo Spulico

Province of Crotone
, Caccuri
Charles V Castle, Crotone
Le Castella, Isola di Capo Rizzuto

Province of Reggio Calabria
, Amendolea
Aragonese Castle, Castrovillari
, Condojanni
Castle of Sant'Aniceto, Motta San Giovanni
, Scilla, Calabria
, Squillace, Calabria
Castle of Stilo, Stilo, Calabria
, Villa San Giovanni
, Villa San Giovanni

Campania

Province of Avellino

 Castel Candriano, Torella dei Lombardi
 Castello di Gesualdo, Gesualdo
 Castello di Rocca San Felice, Rocca San Felice

Province of Benevento
Rocca dei Rettori, Benevento
, Apice
, Cusano Mutri
, Faicchio
, Montesarchio
, San Salvatore Telesino

Province of Caserta
 Castel Campagnano, Province of Caserta
, Gioia Sannitica
Castel Loriano, Marcianise

Province of Naples
, Bacoli
Castello Aragonese, Ischia
, Naples
Carmine Castle, Naples
Castel Capuano, Naples
Castel Nuovo (Maschio Angioino), Naples
Castel dell'Ovo, Naples
Sant'Elmo, Naples
, Naples
Castello di Cicala, Nola

Province of Salerno
Battipaglia Castle, Battipaglia
Caggiano Castle, Caggiano
, Campagna
, Campagna
, Nocera Inferiore
, Salerno
Arechi Castle, Salerno
, Salerno
, Roccapiemonte

Emilia-Romagna

Province of Bologna
Castello di Galeazza, Crevalcore
Rocchetta Mattei, Grizzana Morandi
, Imola
Rocca Malaspina, Monterenzio
, Dozza

Province of Ferrara
Rocca, Cento
Castello Estense, Ferrara
, Mesola
Lambertini Castle, Poggio Renatico

Province of Forlì-Cesena
Rocca Malatestiana, Cesena
Rocca Dovadola, Dovadola
Giaggiolo Castle, Forlì
Monteleone Castle, Roncofreddo
, Forlimpopoli
Rocca delle Caminate, Meldola
, Forlì
, Castrocaro Terme e Terra del Sole

Province of Modena
Castello dei Pio, Carpi
Castello di Montecuccolo, Pavullo nel Frignano
Castello delle Rocche, Finale Emilia
Castello dei Pico, Mirandola
Rocca Estense, San Felice sul Panaro
Vignola Castle (Rocca di Vignola), Vignola

Province of Parma
, Bardi
, Parma
Castello di Compiano, Compiano
Castello di Felino, Felino
Castello di Montechiarugolo, Montechiarugolo
, Corniglio
, Felino
, Tizzano Val Parma
Rocca Sanvitale, Fontanellato
Rocca Sanvitale, Sala Baganza
Castello di Roccabianca, Roccabianca
, Salsomaggiore Terme
Rocca dei Rossi, San Secondo Parmense

Province of Piacenza
, Agazzano
, Agazzano
Castello Malaspiniano, Bobbio
, Borgonovo Val Tidone
, Calendasco
, Carpaneto Piacentino
, Gazzola
, Gazzola
, Gragnano Trebbiense
, Gropparello
Montechino, Montechino
, Pianello Val Tidone
, Piozzano
, Ponte dell'Olio
, Pontenure
, Rivergaro
, San Pietro in Cerro
, Sarmato
, Travo
, Vernasca
, Vigolzone

Province of Ravenna
Brisighella Castle, Brisighella
Cunio Castle, Cotignola
Monte Battaglia, Casola Valsenio
Rocca Estense, Lugo
Rocca Brancaleone, Ravenna

Province of Reggio Emilia
Canossa Castle, Canossa
Castello delle Carpinete, Carpineti
Salame di Felina, Castelnovo Monti
Bianello Castle, Quattro Castella

Province of Rimini
Castello di Montefiore Conca, Montefiore Conca
Castel Sismondo, Rimini
Castello Due Torri, Torriana
Fortress of San Leo, San Leo
Castello Malatestiano Santarcangelo, Santarcangelo di Romagna

Friuli-Venezia Giulia

Province of Gorizia
Castello di Ahrensperg, Biacis
Castello di Cormons, Cormans
Castello di Russiz, Russiz
Castello di Ruttars, Ruttars
Castello di Trussio, Dolegna del Collio
, Monfalcone
Gorizia Castle, Gorizia
, Gradisca
, Savogna d'Isonzo

Province of Pordenone
Castello d'Aviano, Aviano
, Caneva
, Maniago
Castello di Montereale, Montereale Valcellina
, Pinzano al Tagliamento
Castello di Spilimbergo, Spilimbergo
, Chions

Province of Trieste
Duino Castle, Duino
, Muggia
, Trieste
Castello di Miramare, Trieste

Province of Udine
, Attimis
, Forni di Sopra
Udine Castle, Udine

Lazio

Province of Frosinone
Castello Cantelmo, Alvito
Castello di Isoletta, Arce
Torre di Campolato, Arce
Roccaguglielma, Esperia
Castello di Fumone, Fumone
Castello Boncompagni – Viscogliosi, Isola del Liri
Castello di Monte San Giovanni Campano, Monte San Giovanni Campano
Castello di Vicalvi, Vicalvi

Province of Latina
Baronal Castle, Fondi
Angevin-Aragonese Castle, Gaeta
Fortress of Sant'Andrea, Itri
Caetani Castle, Sermoneta

Province of Rieti
 Castello Nobili Vitelleschi, Labro
 Castello Sederini, Collalto Sabino
 Castello Cesarini, Rocca Sinibalda
 Castello Sforza Cesarini, Frasso Sabino
 Castello Orsini, Montenero Sabino
 Castel San Pietro Sabino, frazione of Poggio Mirteto
 Castello di Piscignola, Antrodoco
 Bocchignano, frazione of Montopoli di Sabina
 Castel Sant'Angelo

Province of Rome
Castello di Torre in Pietra, Torre in Pietra
Castello Massimo, Arsoli
Castello Orsini-Odescalchi, Bracciano
Castello Ducale Orsini, Fiano Romano
Borgo Castello di Castiglione, Palombara Sabina
Castello Savelli Torlonia, Palombara Sabina
Castellaccio dei Monteroni, Ladispoli
Castello di Palo, Ladispoli
Castrum Marcellini, Marcellina
Castel Nomentum, Mentana
Castello degli Orsini, Morlupo
Castello Orsini, Nerola
Castle of Julius II, Ostia Antica
Casal de' Pazzi, Rome
Castello di Lunghezza, Rome
Castello della Magliana, Rome
Castel Sant'Angelo, Rome
Castello Theodoli, Sambuci
Castello Orsini-Cesi-Borghese, San Polo dei Cavalieri
Rocca Abbaziale, Subiaco
Rocca Pia, Tivoli
Castello di Rota, Tolfa

Province of Viterbo
Rocca, Civita Castellana
Castello di Latera, Latera
Castello Borgia, Nepi
Castello Orsini, Soriano nel Cimino
Castello Ruspoli, Vignanello
Castello Proceno, Proceno
Torre Alfina, Torre Alfina

Liguria

Province of Genoa
Castello di Busalla, Busalla
Castello della Dragonara, Camogli
Castello di Campo Ligure, Campo Ligure
Chiavari Castle, Chiavari
Albertis Castle, Genoa
Castello Mackenzie, Genoa
Castello Raggio, Genoa
Castello di Isola del Cantone, Isola del Cantone
Castello Spinola-Mignacco, Isola del Cantone
Castello di Montoggio, Montoggio
Castello Brown, Portofino
Castello di Rapallo, Rapallo
Castello di Borgo Fornari, Ronco Scrivia
Castello di Ronco Scrivia, Ronco Scrivia
Castello di Santa Margherita Ligure, Santa Margherita Ligure
Castello di Santo Stefano d'Aveto, Santo Stefano d'Aveto
Castello di Savignone, Savignone
Castello della Pietra, Vobbia
Palazzo Cicala

Province of Imperia
Castello della Lucertola, Apricale
Castello di Dolceacqua, Dolceacqua
Castello d'Appio, Ventimiglia

Province of La Spezia
Castello di San Giorgio, La Spezia
Castello di Lerici, Lerici
Castello di Porto Venere, Porto Venere
Fortezza di Sarzanello, Sarzana
Castello Montetanano, Varese Ligure

Province of Savona
Il Castellaro, Albisola Superiore
Castello di Andora, Andora
Castello di Bardineto, Bardineto
Castello di Cairo Montenotte, Cairo Montenotte
Castelfranco, Finale Ligure
Castel Gavone, Finale Ligure
Castelletto, Finale Ligure
Castel San Giovanni, Finale Ligure
Castello di Millesimo, Millesimo
Castello di Monte Ursino, Noli
Castel Delfino, Pontinvrea
Priamar, Savona
Castello di Spotorno, Spotorno
Castello di Stella, Stella

Lombardy

Province of Bergamo

Barbò Castle, Pumenengo. Built in the 15th century.
, Castelli Calepio. Built in 1430 by the Calepio family.
, Bianzano. Built around 1220–1230.
Camozzi Vertova Castle, Costa di Mezzate. Built in the 12th century.
, Cavernago. Built in the 15th century by the Counts Martinengo-Colleoni.
Malpaga Castle, Cavernago. Built in the 15th century by the warlord Bartolomeo Colleoni.
Marne Castle, Filago. Built in the 14th century by the Avogadri family.
Pagazzano Castle, Pagazzano. Built around 1450–70 by the Sforza family.
Pumenengo Castle, Pumenengo. Built in the 14th century by the Visconti family.
Romano Castle, Romano di Lombardia. Built in the 12th century.
, Bergamo. Built in the 12th century.
, Urgnano. Built in the 14th century by the Visconti family.

Province of Brescia

Bonoris Castle, Montichiari
, Brescia. Built in the 14th century by the Visconti family and the Republic of Venice.
Drugolo Castle, Lonato del Garda
Padenghe Castle, Padenghe sul Garda
Padernello Castle, Padernello. Built in 1485.
, Palazzolo sull'Oglio. Commonly known as Rocca Magna, built in the 9th–12th centuries.
, Sirmione. Built in the 13th century by the Scaliger family.

Province of Como

Castello Baradello, Como. Built in the 12th century by Frederick Barbarossa.
 Castello di Carimate, Carimate. Built in the 14th century by Luchino I Visconti.
Province of Cremona
Pandino Castle, Pandino
Soncino Castle, Soncino. Built in the 10th century and renovated in the 15th century by the Sforza family.

Province of Lecco
Castello Andriani, Dervio, Lombardy

Province of Lodi
Maccastorna Castle, Maccastorna
Sant'Angelo Lodigiano Castle, Sant'Angelo Lodigiano

Province of Mantua

Castles

, Asola. Now ruined.
, Castel d'Ario.
, Castel Goffredo.
Castello San Giorgio, Mantua. Built in the 14th century by the Gonzaga family.
, Castiglione delle Stiviere.
, Cavriana.
, Mariana Mantovana.
, Redondesco.
, Villimpenta.
, Volta Mantovana. Now ruined.

Towers

, Castel Goffredo.
, Castellucchio.
, Piubega.
, Mantua.

Province of Milan

Castles

, Abbiategrasso. Built in the 14th century by the Visconti family.
. Built in the 15th century.
Binasco Castle, Binasco. Built in the 13th–14th century by the Visconti family.
, Buccinasco. Built in the 14th century by the Visconti family.
, Carpiano. Built in the 14th century by the Visconti family.
, Cassano d'Adda. Built in the 13th century by the Visconti family.
, Cassino Scanasio. Built in the 14th century by the Visconti family.
.
, Coazzano. Built in the 14th century by the Visconti family.
, Corneliano Bertario. Built in the 14th century by the Borromeo family.
, Cusago. Built in the 14th century by the Visconti family.
.
, Lacchiarella. Built in the 14th century by the Visconti family but it dates back to the 10th century.
, Legnano. Built in the 13th century by the Della Torre family.
.
.
. Built in the 15th century.
, Melegnano. Known as Castello Mediceo, it was built in the 13th century by the Visconti family.
, Peschiera Borromeo. Built in the 15th century by the Borromeo family.
, Rosate. Built in the 14th century by the Visconti family, now ruined.
, Rozzano. Built in the 15th century.
, San Colombano al Lambro. Built in the 12th century by the Frederick I and renovated in the 14th century by the Visconti family.
Sforza Castle, Milan. Built in the 14th century by the Visconti and Sforza.
, Tolcinasco. Built in the 16th century by the d'Adda family.
, Trezzo sull'Adda. Built in the 14th century by the Visconti family.
, Turbigo. Dated back to the 9th century.
, San Giuliano Milanese. Built in the 14th century.

Towers

, Milan. 
, Milan. Roman tower built by Maximian in the 3rd century.
, Milan. Built by the Gorani family in the 11th century.
, Bernate Ticino. Built in the 15th century.
, Cisliano. Known as Torre dei Gelsi, it was built in the 19th century.
, Truccazzano. Known as the Torrettone, it was built in the 10th century.

Province of Monza and Brianza

Castles

, Aicurzio. Known as Castel Negrino. Built in the 13th century by the Templars.
, Bellusco. Built in the 15th century by Martino da Corte.
, Monza. Built in the 14th century by the Visconti family.
, Sulbiate. Known as Castello Lampugnani, it was built in the 15th century.

Towers

, Seregno. Built in the 12th century by Frederick I.
, Monza. Built in the 13th century.
, Monza. Built in the 6th century by the Lombards.
, Monza. Also known as Port scur in the local dialect, it was built in the 13th century by the Pessina family.
, Vimercate. Fortified gate built in the 12th century.
, Vimercate. Built in the 18th century.

Province of Pavia

Castles

, Agogna.
, Arena Po.
, Argine.
, Belgioioso.
, Celpenchio.
, Chignolo Po.
, Cigognola.
, Cozzo.
, Fortunago.
, Frascarolo.
, Gambolò.
, Lomello.
, Montesegale.
, Montù Berchielli.
, Oramala.
, Robbio.
, Ruino. Known as Castello dal Verme".
, San Gaudenzio.
, Sartirana Lomellina.
, Scaldasole.
, Stefanago.
, Valeggio.
, Varzi.
, Vidigulfo.
, Vigevano.
Visconti Castle, Pavia. Built in the 14th century by the Visconti family.
, Voghera.
, Zavattarello.

Towers

, Pavia. Built in the 11th century, the tower collapsed in 1989.

Province of Sondrio

Castles

, Andalo Valtellino. Ruined.
, Ardenno.
, Tovo di Sant'Agata.
, Bormio. Known as Castello di S.Pietro, now ruined.
, Castione Andevenno.
, Castione Andevenno.
, Chiavenna.
, Chiuro.
, Montagna in Valtellina. Better known as Castel Grumello.
, Tirano.
, Grosio. Also known as Castello Visconti Venosta.
, Grosio. Also known as Castello di S.Faustino.
, Montagna in Valtellina.
Mello Castle, Mello. Also known as Castello di Domofole or Castello della Regina.
, Mese. Better known as Castello dei Peverelli.
, Rogolo. Now ruined.
, Sondrio. Better known as Castello Masegra.
, Tirano. Partially ruined.
, Torre di Santa Maria.

Towers

, Albosaggia.
, Bormio.
, Castello dell'Acqua.
, Bormio.
, Valdidentro.
, Gordona. Known as Torre del Signame, ruined.
, Mazzo di Valtellina. Known as Torre di Pedenale.
, Torricello.
, Chiuro. Known as Castello di S.Pietro, now ruined.
, Samolaco. Better known in the local dialect as Torretta di Columbée.
, Talamona.
, Teglio. Better known in the local dialect as Torre de li beli miri.
, Tirano.
, Bormio.
, Tresivio.

Province of Varese

Castles

Rocca Borromeo di Angera, Angera.
, Caidate.
, Gallarate.
, Caldè.
, Castelseprio. Roman castrum ruined.
, Castiglione Olona.
, Cislago.
, Gallarate.
, Cuasso al Monte.
, Fagnano Olona.
, Induno Olona.
, Jerago.
, Orago.
, Orino.
, Somma Lombardo.
, Tradate.
Masnago Castle, Varese.

Towers

, Laveno Mombello.
, Gornate Olona.
, Varese.

 Marches

Castel d'Emilio, Agugliano
Castel di Luco, Acquasanta Terme
Castello della rancia, Tolentino
Castello dei Brancaleoni, Piobbico
Castello di Lanciano, Castelraimondo
Castello di Loretello, Arcevia
Castello di Monsampietro Morico, Monsampietro Morico
Castello di Montelabbate, Montelabbate
Castello Pallotta, Caldarola
Fortezza Albornoz, Urbino
Rocca Costanza, Pesaro
Rocca di Bolignano, Ancona
Rocca di Borgia, Camerino
Rocca di Gradara, Gradara
Rocca di Mondavio, Mondavio
Rocca di Offagna, Offagna
Rocca di Urbisaglia, Urbisaglia
Rocca Roveresca, Senigallia
Rocca Torrione, Cagli

 Molise

Castello Carafa, Ferrazzano
Castello D'Alessandro, Pescolanciano
Castello dei Pignatelli, Monteroduni
Castello Di Capua, Gambatesa
Castello di Pianisi, Sant'Elia a Pianisi
Castello di Sprondasino, Civitanova del Sannio
Castello Monforte, Campobasso
Castello Pandone, Venafro
Castello Svevo, Termoli

 Piedmont

Province of Alessandria
, Acqui Terme
, Casale Monferrato
Castello dei Torriani e dei Bandello, Castelnuovo Scrivia
Castello di Bergamasco, Bergamasco
Castello di Camino, Camino
Castello di Carbonara Scrivia, Carbonara Scrivia
Castello di Cremolino, Cremolino
, Gabiano
Castello di Lajone di Quattordio, Quattordio
Castello di Morbello, Morbello
Castello di Morsasco, Morsasco
, Novi Ligure
Castello di Orsara Bormida, Orsara Bormida
Castello di Piovera, Piovera
, Pozzol Groppo
Castello di Pozzolo Formigaro, Pozzolo Formigaro
Castello di Prasco, Prasco
Castello di Redabue a Masio, Masio
Castello di Rocca Grimalda, Rocca Grimalda
Castello di Tagliolo Monferrato, Tagliolo Monferrato
, Borghetto di Borbera
Castello Sannazzaro di Giarole, Giarole
Cittadella of Alessandria, Alessandria
, Gavi
, Fubine
Torre di Novi Ligure, Novi Ligure
Torre dei Paleologi, San Salvatore Monferrato

Province of Asti
Castello di Bubbio, Bubbio
, Burio, Costigliole d'Asti
Castello di Castelnuovo Calcea, Castelnuovo Calcea
, Costigliole d'Asti
Castello di Monastero Bormida, Monastero Bormida

Province of Biella
, Cerreto Castello
, Valdengo
, Verrone
, Roppolo
Castello di Zumaglia

Province of Cuneo
, Villanova Solaro
Castello della Manta, Saluzzo
Castello di Grinzane Cavour, Grinzane Cavour
Castle of Racconigi, Racconigi

Province of Novara
, Barengo
, Briona
, Caltignaga
Castello di Nibbiola, Nibbiola
Castello dal Pozzo, Oleggio Castello

Province of Turin
, Agliè
Avigliana castle, Avigliana
, Gassino Torinese
, Borgomasino
, Bruzolo
, Chianocco
Ivrea Castle, Ivrea
Mazzè Castle, Mazzè
Castle of Moncalieri, Moncalieri
Montalto Dora Castle, Montalto Dora
, Ozegna
Pavone Canavese Castle, Pavone Canavese
Castle of Rivoli, Rivoli
Castello San Giorgio Canavese, San Giorgio Canavese
Castello di Venaria Reale, Turin
Palazzo Madama, Turin

Province of Vercelli
, Buronzo
, Moncrivello
, Rovasenda
, Crescentino
, Vettignè
 Castello Visconteo Vercelli

  Sardinia 
 Cagliari 
 Castello di San Michele, Cagliari
 Palazzo Reale, Cagliari
City palaces of Cagliari and fortifications of the town are not noted here.

 Province of Nuoro 

 Castello della Fava, Posada
 Castello di Pontes, Galtellì
 Castello di Medusa, Lotzorai

 Province of Oristano 
 Castello di Ghilarza, Ghilarza 
 Castello Malaspina ( Castello di Serravalle or Castello Bosa), Bosa
 Castello di Medusa, Samugheo
 Castello del Montiferru (Casteddu Ezzu), Cuglieri

 Province of Sassari 

 Castello di Burgos (Castello del Goceano), Burgos
 Castello di Casteldoria, Santa Maria Coghinas
 Castello di Castelsardo, Castelsardo
 Castello di Chiaramonti (Castello dei Doria), Chiaramonti
 Castello Malaspina (Castello di Osilo), Osilo
 Castello di Monteleone Rocca Doria, Monteleone Rocca Doria
 Castello di Pedres, Olbia
 Castello di Sassari, Sassari

 Province of South Sardinia 

 Castello di Acquafredda, Siliqua-Cixerri
 Castello di Arcuentu (Castello di Erculentu), Arbus, castle ruins on Monte Arcuentu
 Castello di Baratuli ( Castello di Monte Oladiri), Monastir
 Casa Fortezza Marchesi de Silva, Villasor
 Castello di Gioiosa Guardia, Villamassargia
 Castello di Salvaterra ( Castello di Iglesias), Iglesias
 Castello di Las Plassas (Castello di Marmilla), Las Plassas
 Castello di Monreale, Sardara
 Castello di Quirra, Villaputzu-Quirra, 
 Castello di Sanluri, Sanluri
 Castello di Sassai (Castello Orguglioso or Castello Orgoglioso), Silius 
 Castello di Villasor (Castello Siviller (di Villasor)), Villasor
 Fortezza Vecchia di Villasimius, Villasimius

 Sicily

In Sicily there are 350 medieval castles and hundreds of other historical periods.

Castello Normanno, Aci Castello
Castello Normanno of Adrano
Castello di Agrigento, Agrigento
Castello di Calatubo, Alcamo
Castello dei Conti di Modica, Alcamo
Castello della Pietra d'Amico, Alessandria della Rocca
Castello di Barrugeri, Aragona
Castello di Bivona, Bivona
Castello di Caccamo, Caccamo
Castellazzo di Camastra, Camastra
Castello di Bifar, Campobello di Licata
Castello Ursino, Catania
Castello di Lombardia, Enna
Castello di Schisò, Giardini Naxos
Mategriffon, Messina
Castello di Milazzo, Milazzo
Castello di Mussomeli
Castelbuono, Palermo
Cuba, Palermo
Zisa, Palermo
Castello Normanno, Paternò
Castello di Donnafugata, Ragusa
Castle of the Counts Luna, Sciacca
Castello di Euryalos, Syracuse
Castello Maniace, Syracuse
Castello di Villagonia, Taormina
Castello di Terra, Trapani

Trentino-Alto Adige/Südtirol

Castello di Arco, Arco
Sabbionara Castle, Avio
Castel Mareccio (Schloss Maretsch), Bolzano
Castel Sant'Antonio, Bolzano
Runkelstein Castle, Bolzano
Sigmundskron Castle, Bolzano
Treuenstein Castle, Bolzano
Castel Vanga, Bolzano
Castello di Brunico, Brunico
Castle of Castellano, Castellano
Reifenstein Castle (Castel Tasso), Freienfeld
Castel Ivano, Ivano-Fracena
Ehrenburg, Kiens
Castel Toblino, Madruzzo
Schloss Brunnenburg, Merano
Castel Fontana, Merano
Castle Tyrol, Merano
Trauttmansdorff Castle, Merano
Castel Verruca, Merano
Castello di Rovereto, Rovereto
Castle Taufers, Sand in Taufers
Castel Gardena, Santa Cristina Gherdëina
Churburg
Castel Thun, Ton
Castello del Buonconsiglio, Trento
Prösels Castle, Völs am Schlern

 Tuscany

Province of Arezzo
 Castello di Belfiore, Capolona
 Castello di Capraia, Talla
 Castello di Caprese Michelangelo
 Castello Cattani, Chiusi della Verna
 Castello di Cennina, Bucine
 Castello dei Conti Guidi, Castel San Niccolò
 Castello dei Conti Guidi, Montemignaio
 Castello dei Conti Guidi, Poppi
 Castello di Faltona, Talla
 Castello di Fronzola, Poppi
 Castello di Gressa, Bibbiena
 Castello di Montauto, Anghiari
 Castello di Montebenichi, Bucine
 Castello di Montecchio Vesponi, Castiglion Fiorentino
 Castello di Porciano, Stia
 Castello di Pieve a Ranco, Arezzo
 Castello di Romena, Pratovecchio
 Castello di Rondini, Arezzo)
 Castelsecco, Arezzo
 Castello di Gargonza, Monte San Savino
 Castello di Pontenano, Talla
 Castello di Valenzano, Subbiano
 Castelnuovo di Subbiano
 Fortezza Medicea, Arezzo
 Rocca del Girifalco, Cortona
 Rocca di Pierle, Cortona

Province of Florence
Belvedere, Florence
, San Casciano in Val di Pesa
, Sesto Fiorentino
, Calenzano
, Barberino Val d'Elsa
Castle of Gabbiano, San Casciano in Val di Pesa
, Impruneta
, Lastra a Signa
, Montespertoli
, Signa
, Florence
, Barberino Val d'Elsa
, Rignano sull'Arno
, Montespertoli
, Bagno a Ripoli
, Sammezzano
, Montespertoli
, Signa
, Florence
, Rignano sull'Arno

Province of Grosseto
 Cassero, Cinigiano
 Cassero, Istia d'Ombrone
 Cassero, Montelaterone
 Cassero, Montieri
 Cassero Senese, or Fortezza'', Grosseto
 Cassero Senese, Roccalbegna
 Castel Diruto, Massa Marittima
 Castel di Pietra, Gavorrano
 Castel Litiano, Roccastrada
 Castello del Dotale, Campagnatico
 Castello del Potentino, Seggiano
 Castello delle Rocchette
 Castello di Batignano
 Castello di Boccheggiano
 Castello di Casallia, Vetulonia
 Castello di Castiglion Bernardi, Monterotondo Marittimo
 Castello di Castiglione della Pescaia
 Castello di Catabbio
 Castello di Cotone, Scansano
 Castello di Cugnano, Monterotondo Marittimo
 Castello di Gerfalco
 Castello di Giuncarico
 Castello di Montemassi
 Castello di Montemerano
 Castello di Lattaia, Roccastrada
 Castello di Magliano in Toscana
 Castello di Marsiliana d'Albegna
 Castello di Marsiliana, Massa Marittima
 Castello di Monte Antico
 Castello di Montebuono
 Castello di Montepescali
 Castello di Montepò, Scansano
 Castello di Monterotondo Marittimo
 Castello di Montiano
 Castello di Monticello Amiata
 Castello di Montorio
 Castello di Montorgiali
 Castello di Montorsaio
 Castello di Penna, Castell'Azzara
 Castello di Pereta
 Castello di Perolla, Massa Marittima
 Castello di Porrona
 Castello di Prata 
 Castello di Punta Ala
 Castello di Ravi
 Castello di Sassoforte, Sassofortino
 Castello di Scerpena, Magliano in Toscana
 Castello di Seggiano
 Castello di Stachilagi, Magliano in Toscana
 Castello di Stertignano, Campagnatico
 Castello di Tatti
 Castello di Torniella
 Castello di Travale
 Castello di Triana
 Castello di Tricosto, Capalbio
 Castello di Valle, Follonica
 Castello di Vetulonia
 Castello di Vicarello, Cinigiano
 Castello di Vitozza, San Quirico
 Castiglion del Torto, Castiglioncello Bandini
 Forte delle Saline, Albinia
 Forte Filippo, Porto Ercole
 Forte Santa Caterina, Porto Ercole
 Forte Stella, Porto Ercole
 Fortezza Spagnola, Porto Santo Stefano
 Palazzo Orsini, Pitigliano
 Palazzo Orsini, Sorano
 Palazzo Sforza Cesarini, Santa Fiora
 Rocca Aldobrandesca, Arcidosso
 Rocca Aldobrandesca, Buriano
 Rocca Aldobrandesca, Campagnatico
 Rocca Aldobrandesca, Cana
 Rocca Aldobrandesca, Capalbio
 Rocca Aldobrandesca, Castell'Azzara
 Rocca Aldobrandesca, Giglio Castello
 Rocca Aldobrandesca, Manciano
 Rocca Aldobrandesca, Porto Ercole
 Rocca Aldobrandesca, Roccalbegna
 Rocca Aldobrandesca, Rocchette di Fazio
 Rocca Aldobrandesca, Saturnia
 Rocca Aldobrandesca, Scarlino
 Rocca Aldobrandesca, Semproniano
 Rocca Aldobrandesca, Sovana
 Rocca Aldobrandesca, Talamone
 Rocca degli Ottieri, Castell'Ottieri
 Rocca di Fregiano, San Valentino
 Rocca di Montauto, Manciano
 Rocca di Montevitozzo
 Rocca di Roccastrada
 Rocca di Roccatederighi
 Rocca Silvana, Selvena
 Rocchette Pannocchieschi, Massa Marittima

Province of Livorno
Old Fortress, Livorno 
Fortezza Nuova, Livorno
Romito Castle, Romito
Gherardesca’s Castle, Bolgheri
Fortress of Populonia, Populonia
Cassero Pisano, Piombino

Province of Lucca
Rocca di Trassilico, Gallicano
Verrucole Castle, San Romano in Garfagnana
Gorfigliano Castle, Gorfigliano Vecchio
Montalfonso Fortress, Castelnuovo di Garfagnana
Castiglione Castle and “Rocca”, Castiglione di Garfagnana
Ceserana Castle, Fosciandora
Montepigoli Castle, Montepigoli
Castelvecchio Castle and “Dongione”, Piazza al Serchio
Este Fortress, Cascio
Sassi Ruines, Sassi
Roccalberti Ruines, Casatico
Molazzana Castle, Molazzana
Nozzano Castle and "Rocca", Nozzano
Bargiglio Tower, Bagni di Lucca
Pietrasanta Fortress and "Rocca di Sala", Pietrasanta
Bozzano Castle, Bozzano
Porcaresi Castle, Villa Basilica
Matilde Tower, Viareggio
Fort, Forte dei Marmi

Province of Massa and Carrara
, Massa
, Fosdinovo
, Fivizzano

Province of Pisa
Medicean Fortress, Volterra
Silla’s Fortress, Pietracassia
Santa Maria Castle, Vecchiano
Castellare Fortress, Asciano
Verruca Fortress, Calci
Sancasciani Castle, Ripoli
Frederick II Castle, San Miniato al Tedesco
Montecastelli Fortress, Montecastelli
Gambacorti’s Castle, Filettole
Roncioni’s Castle, Ripafratta

Province of Pistoia
Santa Barbara Fortress, Pistoia, Pistoia

Province of Prato
Castello dell'Imperatore, Prato

Province of Siena
Castello della Magione, Poggibonsi
Castello delle Quattro Torra, Siena
Castello di Belcaro, Siena
Castello di Brolio, Gaiole in Chianti
Castello di Meleto, Gaiole in Chianti, Siena
Castello Monteriggioni, Monteriggioni
Castello di Spedaletto, Pienza
Castello di Staggia Senese, Poggibonsi
Fortress of Poggio Imperiale, Poggibonsi
Rocca Aldobrandesca di Piancastagnaio, Piancastagnaio
Rocca Montalcino, Montalcino

Umbria

Rocca Maggiore, Assisi
Castelbuono di Bevagna, Bevagna
Castello del Leone, Castiglione del Lago
Castello di Montalera, Panicale
, Murlo
Castello di Petroia, Gubbio
Castello di Reschio, Lisciano Niccone
Castello di Procoio, Perugia
, Narni
The Castellina, Norcia
Fortezza dell'Albornoz, Orvieto
Rocca di Sberna, Orvieto
Rocca Flea, Gualdo Tadino
Rocca Ripesena, Orvieto
Rocca Paolina, Perugia
, Spoleto
Castello di Monterone, Perugia
Todi Castle, Todi
Castello di Montegiove, Orvieto

Veneto

Province of Belluno
Castel Del Covolo, Cismon del Grappa
Castello Colmirano, Alano Di Piave
Castello Del Bongaio, Lamosano - Chies D'alpago
Castello Di Alboino, Feltre
Castello Di Andraz, Livinallongo del Col di Lana
Castello Di Arten, Fonzaso
Castello Di Avoscan, San Tomaso Agordino
Castello Di Bivai, Bivai
Castello di Botestagno, Cortina d’Ampezzo
Castello Di Lusa, Feltre
Castello Di Marsiai, Marsiai
Castello Di Misso, Sospirolo
Castello Di Quero, Quero
Castello di Zumelle, Feltre

Province of Padua
Castello di Padova, Padua
Cittadella, Padua
Castello del Catajo, Battaglia Terme
Cini Castle, Monselice
Castello Della Montecchia, Selvazzano Dentro
Castello di Lispida, Monselice
Castello di San Martino della Vaneza, Cervarese Santa Croce
Castello Este, Este
Castello di Valbona, Lozzo Atestino
Castello Di San Pelagio, Padova
Castello Di San Zeno, Montagnana
Rocca Degli Alberi, Montagnana

Province of Rovigo
Castello di Rovigo, Rovigo
Castel Trivellin, Lendinara
Castello di Arquà, Arquà Polesine
Castello Di Sariano, Trecenta

Province of Treviso
Castelbrando, Cison di Valmarino
Castello di Roncade, Roncade
Castello di Vidor, Vidor
Castelletto Di Cappella Maggiore, Cappella Maggiore

Province of Venezia
, Santa Maria di Sala
, Mestre
, Venezia
, Noale
, Jesolo

Province of Verona
Castello Scaligeri, Malcesine
, Soave
Castelvecchio, Verona
, Bevilacqua

Province of Vicenza
Palazzo Porto Colleoni Thiene, Thiene
, Montegalda

See also
List of castles

References